Danial Afzal Khan is a Pakistani television and film actor. He played leading roles in many television shows including Kab Mere Kehlaoge, Mann Kay Dhagay, Zara Sambhal Kay, Thori Si Wafa, Umm-e-Haniya, Raaz-e-Ulfat, Ghisi Piti Muhabbat, Mohlat, Aye Musht-e-Khaak and recent on air Saaya & Angnaa.

Filmography

Television

Telefilm

Film

Web

References

External links 
 

Pakistani male television actors
Pakistani male film actors
Year of birth missing (living people)
Living people
21st-century Pakistani male actors